Karva Chauth is a festival celebrated by Hindu women of Northern and Western India in October or November on the Hindu lunar month of Kartika. Like many Hindu festivals, Karva Chauth is based on the lunisolar calendar which accounts for all astronomical positions, especially positions of the moon which is used as a marker to calculate important dates. The festival falls on the fourth day after the full moon.

On Karva Chauth, married women and unmarried women, especially observe a fast from sunrise to moonrise for the safety and longevity of their husbands. The Karva Chauth fast is traditionally celebrated in the states of Delhi, Haryana, Rajasthan, Punjab, Jammu,Madhya Pradesh,Uttar Pradesh, Himachal Pradesh. It is celebrated as Atla Tadde in Andhra Pradesh.

Origins 
Karva is another word for 'pot' (a small earthen pot of water) and chauth means 'fourth' in Hindi (a reference to the fact that the festival falls on the fourth day of the dark-fortnight, or Krishna paksh, of the month of Kartik). In Sanskrit scriptures, the festival is addressed as Karka Chaturthi, Karka meaning an earthen water pitcher and Chaturthi denotes fourth day of lunar Hindu month.

Karva Chauth is mostly celebrated in Northern India. One hypothesis is that military campaigns were often conducted by men in far off places whereby men would leave their wives and children at home to go off to the war. Their wives would often pray for their safe return. The festival also coincides with the wheat-sowing time (i.e., the beginning of the Rabi crop cycle). Big earthen pots in which wheat is stored are sometimes called Karvas, so the fast may have begun as a prayer for a good harvest in this predominantly wheat-eating Northwestern region.

Another story about the origin of this festival relates to the bond of feminine friendship. With the custom of arranged marriage being prevalent, the newlywed is supposed to reside with her husband and in-laws. Being new to the family, the custom arose of befriending another woman as her friend (kangan-saheli) or sister (dharam-behn) for life. The friendship would be sanctified through a Hindu ritual during the marriage ceremony itself. The bride's friend would usually be of the same age (or slightly older), typically married into the same village (so that she would not go away) and not directly related to her in-laws (so there was no conflict of interest later). This emotional and psychological bond would be considered akin to a blood relationship. It is said that Karva Chauth festival evolved to include celebrating this special bond of friendship.

A few days before Karva Chauth, married women would buy new Karvas (spherical clay pots)—7-9" in diameter and 2–3 litres capacity—and paint them on the outside with beautiful designs. Inside, they would put bangles and ribbons, home-made candy and sweets, make-up items, and small clothes. The women would then visit each other on the day of Karva Chauth and exchange these Karvas.

Annual dates 

The following dates are based on the Hindu calendar.

Rituals

Women begin preparing for Karva Chauth a few days in advance, by buying adornments (shringar), jewelry, and puja items, such as the Karva lamps, matthi, Mehandi and the decorated puja thali (plate). Local bazaars take on a festive look as shopkeepers put their Karva Chauth related products on display. On the day of the fast, women from Punjab awake to eat and drink just before sunrise. In Uttar Pradesh, celebrants eat soot feni with milk in sugar on the eve of the festival. It is said that this helps them go without water the next day. In Punjab, sargi (ਸਰਗੀ) is an important part of this pre-dawn meal and always includes fenia. It is traditional for the sargi to be sent or given to the fasting woman by her mother-in-law. If she lives with her mother-in-law, the pre-dawn meal is prepared by the mother-in-law. On Karva Chauth occasion, fasting women choose to wear Karva chauth special dresses like a traditional saari or lehenga to look their best. In some regions, women wear traditional dresses of their states.

The fast begins at dawn. Fasting women do not eat during the day. Hindu wives perform various kind of rituals along with Vrat (fast) on Karva chauth for their husband's long life. Saint Garibdas Ji Maharaj says:Kahe jo karava chauth kahaanee| Taas gadaharee nishchay jaanee||

Kare ekaadashee sanjam soee| Karava chauth gadaharee hoee||In traditional observances of the fast, the fasting woman usually does no housework. Women apply Mehandi and other cosmetics to themselves and each other. The day passes in meeting friends and relatives. In some regions, it is customary to give and exchange painted clay pots filled with put bangles, ribbons, home-made candy, cosmetics and small cloth items (e.g., handkerchiefs). Since Karva Chauth follows soon after the Kharif crop harvest in the rural areas, it is a good time for community festivities and gift exchanges. Parents often send gifts to their married daughters and their children.

In the evening, a community women-only ceremony is held. Participants dress in fine clothing and wear jewellery and mehandi, and (in some regions) dress in the complete finery of their wedding dresses. The dresses (saris or Lehangs) are frequently red, gold, pink, yellow or orange, which are considered auspicious colors. In Uttar Pradesh, women wear saris or lehangas. The fasters sit in a circle with their puja thalis. Depending on region and community, a version of the story of Karva Chauth is narrated, with regular pauses. The storyteller is usually an older woman or a priest, if one is present. The Karva Chauth puja song is sung collectively. In some parts of Uttar Pradesh, in the pauses, the singers perform the feris (passing their thalis around in the circle). While in other parts, the women keep some rice etc. in their hands while listening to the story.

The first six describe some of the activities of fast and the seventh describes the lifting of those restrictions with the conclusion of the fast. The forbidden activities include weaving cloth (kumbh chrakhra feri naa), pleading with or attempting to please anyone (ruthda maniyen naa), and awakening anyone who is asleep (suthra jagayeen naa). For the first six feris they sing

For the seventh feri, they sing

In Uttar Pradesh and Rajasthan, participants exchange Karvas seven times between themselves. In Rajasthan, before offering water seven times the fasting woman is asked "Dhapi ki Ni Dhapi?" (are you satiated?), to which she responds, "Jal se Dhapi, Suhaag se na Dhapi" (I am satiated by water, but not from [love of] my husband). An alternative ritual conducted by Uttar Pradeshis is prayer of "gaur mata" the earth. Specifically, celebrants will take a bit of soil, sprinkle water, and then place kumkum on it, treating it as an idol/manifestation of the fertile Mother Earth. In Rajasthan, stories are told by older women in the family, including narratives of Karva Chauth, Shiv, Parvati and Ganesh. In earlier times, an idol of Gaur Mata was made using earth and cow dung, which has now been replaced with an idol of Parvati. In some communities, especially in and around Bangalore, a visual depiction of HG is used. Each fasting woman lights an earthen lamp in her thali while listening to the Karva story. Sindoor, incense sticks and rice are also kept in the thali.

In Uttar Pradesh, a priest or an elderly woman of the family narrates the story of beejabeti or Veervati. Celebrants make Gauri, Ganesh and Shankar idols with mud and decorate them with colourful and bright clothes and jewellery. While exchanging Karvas seven times, they sing

Thereafter, the fasters offer baayna (a melange of goodies like halwa, puri, namkeen mathri, meethi mathri, etc.) to the idols (mansana) and hand over to their mother-in-law or sister-in-law.

The fera ceremony concluded, the women await the rising of the moon. Once the moon is visible, depending on the region and community, it is customary for a fasting woman, to view moon or its reflection in a vessel filled with water, through a sieve, or through the cloth of a dupatta. Then, the woman looks at her husband's face through te sieve. Water is offered (arka) to the moon (Chandra, the lunar deity) to secure its blessings. In some regions, the woman says a brief prayer asking for her husband's life. It is believed that at this stage, spiritually strengthened by her fast, the woman can successfully confront and defeat death (personified by Yama). In Rajasthan, the women say "Like the gold necklace and the pearl bracelet, just like the moon may my suhaag always shine brightly."

Her husband then takes the water from the thali and offers it to his wife; taking her first sip of water during the day, the fast is now broken and the woman can have a complete meal.

Popular cultural aspects and critiques

In modern North India and Northwestern India society, Karva Chauth is considered to be a romantic festival, symbolizing the love between a husband and wife. It has been celebrated in Bollywood movies such as Dilwale Dulhania Le Jayenge, where an unmarried woman signals her love for a man by keeping the fast for him and he reciprocates by secretly fasting as a gesture of empathy, as well as demonstrating his concern for her during the day and breaking her fast by feeding her at moonrise, and Baghban, in which a man persuades his elderly fasting wife to break her fast over the telephone because they have been separated by their uncaring children. News coverage of celebrities sometimes highlights the keeping of the fast by an unmarried public figure because it indicates a strong and likely permanent romantic attachment. Similar to Valentine's Day, the lack of a romantic partner can acutely be felt by unattached women. The festival is used extensively in advertising campaigns in the region, for instance in a Chevrolet TV spot in which a man demonstrates his caring for his wife by buying a car with a sunroof so he can drive her around on Karva Chauth night until she spots the moon through it.

Thanks to Bollywood, Karva Chauth is not limited to being a North Indian festival anymore. It is now glamorized and widely popular function in India.

Since Karva Chauth is celebrated primarily by women (men are entirely excluded from the festival's observances until moonrise, though they are expected to demonstrate attention and concern for their fasting wives) and because beauty rituals and dressing-up are a significant part of the day, the festival is seen as an event that bonds women together. In the present day, groups of unmarried women sometimes keep the fast out of a sense of friendship, though this practice is far from universal. This is especially true in the urban areas of North India and Northwestern India is interpreted as a prayer for a loving husband in the future. Another trend in the northern urban areas is the spreading of the festival's observance to few women originating in communities and regions (such as immigrants in Mumbai,Kumaon Garhwal) that have not traditionally celebrated Karva Chauth or even been aware of the festival's existence. The same is true for Gujarat. Karva Chauth 2018 Date 27 October

There have been calls to modify or eliminate the festival by commentators who hold it to be "anti-women" and to "perpetuate the notion of women's dependence on men." Karva chauth has been cited as a symbol of cultural repression of women by some Indian feminists, such as Madhu Kishwar who has put it in the same class as "Khomeinivad" (i.e., pushing women into position of subservience to their husbands, similar to the family structure allegedly favored by Ayatollah Khomeini). Other feminists, however, have called the festival empowering for women because Karva Chauth enables them to quit housework completely for the day and expect gifts from their husbands. Some writers have asserted that such "rituals work insidiously" to create "an instrument of social control" that oppresses women and that the even greater popularity of Karva Chauth among urban, educated participants raises the question of "which is the greater barrier to women's liberation: religion or the market."

Traditional tales 
There are legends associated with the Karva Chauth festival. In some tellings, the tales are interlinked, with one acting as a frame story for another.

Story of Queen Veervati
A beautiful queen called Veervati was the only sister of seven loving brothers. She spent her first Karva Chauth as a married woman at her parents' house. She began a strict fast after sunrise but, by evening, was desperately waiting for the moonrise as she suffered severe thirst and hunger. Her seven brothers couldn't bear to see their sister in such distress and created a mirror in a pipal tree that made it look as though the moon had risen. The sister mistook it for the moon and broke her fast. The moment she took the first morsel of food, she sneezed. In her second morsel she found hair. After the third she learned the news of her husband, the king, was dead. Heartbroken, she wept through the night until her shakti compelled a Goddess to appear and ask why she crying. When the queen explained her distress, the Goddess revealed how she had been tricked by her brothers and instructed her to repeat the Karva Chauth fast with complete devotion. When Veervati repeated the fast, Yama was forced to restore her husband to life.

In a variant of this story, the brothers build a massive fire behind a mountain instead and trick their sister by convincing her that the glow is the moon. She breaks her fast and word arrives that her beloved husband has died. She immediately begins running to her husband's house, which is somewhat distant, and is intercepted by Shiva-Parvati. Parvati reveals the trickery to her, cuts her own little finger to give the wife a few drops of her holy blood, and instructs her to be careful in keeping the complete fast in the future. The wife sprinkles Parvati's blood on her dead husband and, coming back to life, they are reunited.

Legend of Mahabharata
The belief in this fast and its associated rituals goes back to the pre-Mahabharata times. Draupadi, too, is said to have observed this fast. Once Arjun went to the Nilgiris for penance and the rest of the Pandavas faced many problems in his absence. Draupadi, out of desperation, remembered Lord Krishna and asked for help. Lord Krishna reminded her that on an earlier occasion, when Goddess Parvati had sought Lord Shiva's guidance under similar circumstances, she had been advised to observe the fast of Karva Chauth. In some tellings of this legend, Shiva tells Parvati the story of Veervati to describe the Karva Chauth fast. Draupadi followed the instructions and observed the fast with all its rituals. Consequently, the Pandavas were able to overcome their problems.

The legend of Karva
A woman named Karva was deeply devoted to her husband. Her intense love and dedication towards him gave her shakti (spiritual power). While bathing at a river, her husband was caught by a crocodile. Karva bound the crocodile with cotton yarn and asked Yama (the god of death) to send the crocodile to hell. Yama refused. Karva threatened to curse Yama and destroy him. Yama, afraid of being cursed by a Pati-vrat (devoted) wife, sent the crocodile to hell and blessed Karva's husband with a long life. Karva and her husband enjoyed many years of wedded bliss. To this day, Karva Chauth is celebrated with great faith and belief.

Satyavan and Savitri
When Lord Yama came to procure Satyavan's soul, Savitri begged him to grant him life. When he refused, she stopped eating and drinking and followed Yama who carried away her dead husband. Yama said that she could ask for any other boon except for the life of her husband. Savitri asked that she be blessed with children. Yama agreed. Being a "'Pati-Vrata'" (devoted) wife, Savitri would never let any other man be the father of her children. Yama was left with no other choice but to restore Savitri's husband to life. This story refers to Savitri Amavasya and not Karva Chauth. Which is widely observed by married women in the state of Odisha.

See also
 Vivaah

References

Hindu festivals
October observances
Vrata
Marriage in India
November observances
Hindu festivals in India
Religious festivals in India
Women's festivals